Nipponentomon is a genus of proturans in the family Acerentomidae.

Species
 Nipponentomon andrei (Ewing, 1940)
 Nipponentomon aureitarsum Ewing, 1940
 Nipponentomon bidentatum Nakamura, 2004
 Nipponentomon bifidum Rusek, 1974
 Nipponentomon californicum Hilton, 1929
 Nipponentomon heterothrici Yin & Xie, 1993
 Nipponentomon kamui Imadaté, 1965
 Nipponentomon kevani Rusek, 1974
 Nipponentomon khabarovskense Nakamura, 2004
 Nipponentomon macleani Nosek, 1977
 Nipponentomon nippon (Yosii, 1938)
 Nipponentomon uenoi Imadaté & Yosii, 1959

References

Protura